May El Calamawy (born October 28, 1986) is an Egyptian-Palestinian actress who has worked and resided in the United States since 2015. She is known for her roles in the American television series Ramy as Dena Hassan, and Moon Knight as Layla El-Faouly.

Early life 
Calamawy was born on October 28, 1986, in Bahrain to an Egyptian father who worked as a banker, and a Palestinian-Jordanian mother. She has an older brother. Raised mostly in Bahrain, she also spent six years living between Doha, Qatar, and Houston, Texas, before she was twelve years old. Calamawy speaks English and Arabic. 

She was inspired to become an actress after watching the 1992 film Death Becomes Her when she was a child.

Calamawy completed high school in Bahrain, and at 17 she moved to Boston, Massachusetts, to study industrial design, because her father wanted her to. She then lived in Dubai for five years before moving back to the United States to pursue an acting career. 

She applied to Emerson College and told her parents, "If I get in, I'm going." She was accepted and earned a B.A. in theatre studies. Calamawy has also studied at the William Esper Studio in New York City.

Career 
Calamawy started her career acting in short films and used to be credited with her full name, May El Calamawy. She later changed it to May Calamawy. After attending college, she participated in the New York Arab American Comedy Festival. From 2009 to 2014, she was dividing her time between Dubai and Abu Dhabi, acting in shorts and a TV pilot.

Her first major film role was in Tobe Hooper's 2013 film Djinn, the first horror film to be produced in the United Arab Emirates. 

In 2017, she had a recurring role in the National Geographic miniseries The Long Road Home and guest-starring roles in The Brave and Madam Secretary. The following year, she guest-starred in the CBS crime drama television series FBI. 

In October 2018, it was announced that she would have a recurring role in the Hulu comedy-drama series Ramy, playing Ramy's sister, Dena Hassan. In 2020, she had a voice role as Ellie Malik in the video game NBA 2K21.

In 2021, she appeared in the film Together Together, with Ed Helms and Patti Harrison. In January of the same year, it was announced she would appear in the Disney+ miniseries Moon Knight, which premiered on March 30, 2022, where Calamawy portrayed Layla El-Faouly, an Egyptian archeologist and estranged wife of Marc Spector (portrayed by Oscar Isaac). Layla was the first Arab character and superhero in the Marvel Cinematic Universe.

In July 2022, it was announced that she would join the voice cast of Moon Girl and Devil Dinosaur as a guest star. The show premiered on Disney Channel and Disney+ in 2023. In October 2022, she was announced in the cast of Duke Johnson's upcoming thriller, The Actor.

Personal life
Calamawy was diagnosed with the autoimmune disease alopecia areata at the age of 22. Her alopecia was incorporated into the storyline of her character Dena Hassan in Ramy during the show's second season.

Since 2015, Calamawy has resided in the United States.

Filmography

Films

Television

Video games

References

External links 
 
 
 
 

1986 births
Living people
Egyptian film actresses
Palestinian film actresses
Egyptian television actresses
Palestinian television actresses
21st-century Egyptian actresses
21st-century Palestinian actresses
Emerson College alumni
Egyptian expatriates in the United States
Palestinian expatriates in the United States